Homer (also known as "Homer Station") is an unincorporated area in Russell County, Kansas, United States. It lies on the border between Grant and Russell Townships. There is no community or settlement at Homer.

History
Homer was once a stop on the Union Pacific Railroad. A rural post office operated at the site from 1879 to 1887.

Geography

Transportation
Homer lies immediately east of the intersection of U.S. Route 40 Business, which runs southeast–northwest, and Homer Road, an unpaved east–west county road.

The Kansas Pacific (KP) Line of the Union Pacific Railroad runs through Homer, parallel to the U.S. 40 business route.

References

Further reading

External links
 Russell County Maps: Current, Historic, KDOT

Unincorporated communities in Russell County, Kansas
Unincorporated communities in Kansas